Für alle Zeiten is the fifth studio album by German recording artist Alexander Klaws. It was released by Sony Music on Deag Music on 23 September 2011 in German-speaking Europe.

Track listing

Charts

References

2011 albums
Alexander Klaws albums
German-language albums